Nate Miller may refer to:

 Nate Miller (boxer) (born 1963), American boxer
 Nate Miller (basketball) (1987–2022), American basketball player
 Nate Miller (defensive back) (born 1958), American football player
 Nate Miller (offensive lineman) (born 1971), American football player
 Nate Miller (coach) (born 1987), American soccer coach